The Bhikki Power Plant is a 1,180 MW RLNG based combined cycle power plant located near Sheikhupura, in the Punjab province of Pakistan. This is the first RLNG based power plant which is developed by Government of Punjab through its own resources. The plant is owned and operated by Quaid-e-Azam Thermal Power Limited (QATPL), a company wholly-owned by the government of Punjab. It is one of the three major RLNG power plants including Haveli Bahadur Shah and Balloki which are built between 2015 and 2018 to curb the electricity loadshedding in Pakistan. Letter of Intent (LOI) issued on 13 May, 2015 and the project achieved its commercial operations in just 34 months on May 20, 2018.

See also 

 List of dams and reservoirs in Pakistan
 List of power stations in Pakistan
 Haveli Bahadur Shah Power Plant
 Balloki Power Plant
 Punjab thermal power plant

References 

Natural gas-fired power stations in Pakistan
Energy in Punjab, Pakistan